Ravil Sabirzyanovich Valiyev (born 20 October 1966) is a former Russian professional footballer and referee.

Club career
He made his professional debut in the Soviet Second League in 1983 for FC Krylia Sovetov Kuybyshev.

Referee career
After his retirement and until 2006 he worked as a referee, mostly in the third-tier PFL.

References

1966 births
Living people
Soviet footballers
Russian footballers
Association football midfielders
Russian Premier League players
PFC Krylia Sovetov Samara players
FC Lada-Tolyatti players
Russian football referees
FC Neftekhimik Nizhnekamsk players
FC Iskra Smolensk players